Seyfettin Yılmaz (born 2 February 1968) is a Turkish politician from the Nationalist Movement Party (MHP), who has served as a Member of Parliament for Adana since 7 June 2015.

Born in Pozantı, Adana, Yılmaz graduated from Istanbul University Faculty of Forestry. He was employed in the Adana Forestry Office, the General Office of Forestry and served as the interim manager of water works at the Adana Metropolitan Municipality. He was elected as a MHP Member of Parliament at the June 2015 general election. He is married with one child and speaks English at a semi-fluent level.

See also
25th Parliament of Turkey

References

External links
 Collection of all relevant news items at Haberler.com
 Collection of all relevant news items at Son Dakika

Nationalist Movement Party politicians
Deputies of Adana
Members of the 25th Parliament of Turkey
Living people
People from Adana
1968 births
Members of the 24th Parliament of Turkey
Members of the 26th Parliament of Turkey